The death wail is a keening, mourning lament, generally performed in ritual fashion soon after the death of a member of a family or tribe. Examples of death wails have been found in numerous societies, including among the Celts of Europe; and various indigenous peoples of Asia, the Americas, Africa, and Australia.

Australia

Early accounts
Some early accounts of the death wail describe its employment in the aftermath of fighting and disputes. One such discussion can be found in the second volume of Edward Eyre's Journal of Expeditions of Discovery Into Central Australia (1845). Eyre describes what appears to have been a parlay between the members of two rival tribes —

Ernest Giles, who traversed Australia in the 1870s and 1880s, left an account of a skirmish that took place between his survey party and members of a local tribe in the Everard Ranges of mountains in 1882. "Our foes did not again appear," he recorded. "At the first dawn of light, over at some rocky hills south-westward, where, during the night, we saw their camp fires, a direful moaning chant arose. It was wafted on the hot morning air across the valley, echoed again by the rocks and hills above us, and was the most dreadful sound I think I ever heard; it was no doubt a death-wail. From their camp up in the rocks, the chanters descended to the lower ground, and seemed to be performing a funereal march all round the central mass, as the last tones we heard were from behind the hills, where it first arose."

A wax cylinder recording of the death wail of a Torres Strait Islander, made in 1898, exists in the Ethnographic Wax Cylinder collection maintained by the British Library.

Modern accounts
A more modern account of the death wail has been given by Roy Barker, a descendant of the Murawari tribe, some fifty miles north of the present town of Brewarrina. Barker was born on the old Aboriginal mission in the late 1920s and left there in the early 1940s.

"You hear the crying and the death wail at night," he recalled, "it's a real eerie, frightening sound to hear. Sad sound... to hear them all crying. And then after the funeral, everything would go back to normal. And they'd smoke the houses out, you know, the old Aboriginal way."

Asia 
China

Ritual wailing occurred as part of funerary rites in ancient China. These wails and laments were not (or were not always) uncontrollable expressions of emotion. Albert Galvany argues they were in fact "subject to a strict and complex process of codification that determines, right down to the finest details, the place, the timing and the ways in which such expressions of pain should be proffered".

The Liji ("Book of Rites") proclaimed that the mourner's type of relationship with the deceased dictated where the death wails should take place: for your brother it should take place in the ancestral temple; for your father's friend, opposite the great door of the ancestral temple; for your friend, opposite the main door of their private lodging; for an acquaintance, out in the countryside.

India

An oppari is an ancient form of lamenting in southern India, particularly in Tamil Nadu and North-East Sri Lanka where Tamils form the majority. It is a folk song tradition and is often an admixture of eulogy and lament. The oppari is typically sung by a group of female relatives who come to pay respects to the departed in a death ceremony. It in a means to express one's own grief and also to share and assuage the grief of the near and dear of the diseased. Sometimes professional oppari singers are recruited, but it is a dying practice.

Hawaii 
During the 1920s, ethnographers Laura Green and Martha Warren Beckwith described witnessing "old customs" such as death wails still in practice:

Death wail in literature
The death wail is mentioned in many literary works:

"She began the high, whining keen of the death wail... It rose to a high piercing whine and subsided into a moan.  Mama raised it three times and then she turned and went into the house..." 
John Steinbeck's short story "Flight", set in the Santa Lucia Mountains

Tsitsi Dangarembga's Nervous Conditions, set in post-colonial Rhodesia (now Zimbabwe) gives an account of the death wail.

See also
Keening
Banshee
Oppari

References

Further reading
 Describes the death wail in the Taribelang language, with a literal translation and comments on music and language.

 Contains a discussion of Armitage's work.

External links

Media
British Library website with downloadable sound file of 1898 death wail. Requires Windows Media Player.
Video of Death wail performed by 2 women of the Manobo-Dulangan tribe of the southern Philippines (YouTube)

Australian Aboriginal music
Ceremonies
Death music